The Anatomy of Melancholy is a live album by the British gothic metal band Paradise Lost. It was recorded on 12 April 2007 at the Koko (London). The album was released on double DVD and double CD. There is also a deluxe 4-disc edition containing both aforementioned releases. The artwork was provided by Greek artist Seth Siro Anton.

Track listing
 "Intro"
 "The Enemy"
 "Grey"
 "Erased"
 "Red Shift"
 "So Much Is Lost"
 "Sweetness"
 "Praise Lamented Shade"
 "Pity the Sadness"
 "Forever Failure"
 "Once Solemn"
 "As I Die"
 "Embers Fire"
 "Mouth"
 "No Celebration"
 "Eternal"
 "True Belief"
 "One Second"
 "The Last Time"
 "Gothic"
 "Say Just Words"
 "Isolate" (DVD Only, not listed on the tracklisting)

Track Information
Track 1 is from The Anatomy of Melancholy
Track 2 & 8 are from In Requiem
Track 3 & 5 are from Paradise Lost
Track 4, 15, & 22 are from Symbol of Life
Track 6 is from Host
Track 7, 13 & 17 are from Icon
Track 9, 12 is from Shades of God
Track 10, 11, & 19 are from Draconian Times
Track 14 is from Believe in Nothing
Track 16 & 20 are from Gothic
Track 18 & 21 are from One Second

Band line-up
 Nick Holmes – vocals
 Greg Mackintosh  – lead guitars
 Aaron Aedy – rhythm guitars
 Steve Edmondson – bass guitar
 Jeff Singer – drums

Charts

References

Paradise Lost (band) albums
2008 live albums
Albums with cover art by Spiros Antoniou